Ralph Paul Siewert (December 31, 1923 – November 21, 1990) was an American professional basketball player. He played for the St. Louis Bombers and Toronto Huskies during the inaugural 1946–47 season of the Basketball Association of America.

Career 
At high school in Mount Clemens, Michigan, Siewart was both a center in basketball and a first baseman in baseball.

In 1944, he was a batting practice pitcher for the Detroit Tigers. Ideally, the team would have sent him to the minor leagues for experience, but the team could not imagine him folding his long legs on bus rides. He also played for the New York Yankees as well as other farm teams. His baseball career ended after suffering an elbow injury when he was hit by a drive from Rudy York.

Siewert then went to college at Dakota Wesleyan University, where Siewert earned the nickname "Sky", and later "Timber." His college career ended prematurely when it was discovered that he had pitched professionally. Afterwards, he signed to play American football with the Chicago Rockets of the All-America Football Conference.

Siewert started his professional basketball career with the St. Louis Bombers.  Fans started calling Siewert "Timber" because he kept falling like a tree when knocked down by stronger players.  In February 1947, the Toronto Huskies acquired Siewert.  Siewert averaged just 1.1 points per game with the Huskies and had the lowest field goal percentage on the team.

Siewert scored a total of 20 points in his 21-game career.

BAA career statistics

Regular season

References

External links
 

1923 births
1990 deaths
American expatriate basketball people in Canada
American men's basketball players
Basketball players from Michigan
Centers (basketball)
Dakota Wesleyan Tigers men's basketball players
People from Mount Clemens, Michigan
St. Louis Bombers (NBA) players
Sportspeople from Metro Detroit
Toronto Huskies players